Sorrell and Son may refer to:

Novel
Sorrell and Son (novel), highly popular 1925 novel by Warwick Deeping

Film
 Sorrell and Son (1927 film), 1927 film based on the novel
 Sorrell and Son (1934 film), 1934 film based on the novel

Television
 Sorrell and Son (TV series), a 1984 British mini-series